Didion is a surname. Notable people with the surname include:

Joan Didion (1934–2021), American writer
John Didion (1947–2013), American football player